The 2015–16 Chattanooga Lady Mocs basketball team represented the University of Tennessee at Chattanooga during the 2015–16 NCAA Division I women's basketball season. The Lady Mocs, led by third year head coach Jim Foster, play their home games at the McKenzie Arena and are members of the Southern Conference. They begin the season ranked 25th in the AP poll. They finished the season 24–8, 12–2 in SoCon play to share the SoCon regular season title with Mercer. They also won the SoCon Women's Tournament to earn an automatic trip to the NCAA women's tournament where they lost in the first round to Mississippi State.

Roster

Schedule

 
|-
!colspan=9 style="background:#00386B; color:#E0AA0F;"| Non-conference Regular Season

|-
!colspan=9 style="background:#00386B; color:#E0AA0F;"| SoCon Regular Season
|-

|-
!colspan=9 style="background:#00386B; color:#E0AA0F;"| SoCon Tournament

|-
!colspan=9 style="background:#00386B; color:#E0AA0F;"| NCAA Women's Tournament

Source:

Rankings

References

Chattanooga Mocs women's basketball seasons
Chattanooga
Chattanooga Mocs
Chattanooga Mocs
Chattanooga